The 2003 European Winter Throwing Challenge was held on 1 and 2 March at Stadio Polivalente Gioia Tauro in Gioia Tauro, Italy. It was the third edition of the athletics competition for throwing events organised by the European Athletics Association. A total of 137 athletes from 24 countries entered the competition.

The competition featured men's and women's contests in shot put, discus throw, javelin throw and hammer throw. Several events were split into two groups due to the number of entries. Russia and Germany were the top performing nations at the competition. Russia won the women's division on points and had the largest medal haul with one gold, four silver and three bronze medals. Germany topped the men's points table and was the only nation to win two gold medals at the challenge. The host nation, Italy, ranked third in both the men's and women's categories.

Three medallists in Gioia Tauro went on to reach the podium at the 2003 World Championships in Athletics. Women's hammer throwers Manuela Montebrun and Olga Kuzenkova were world bronze and silver medallists, respectively, while Steffi Nerius (women's javelin winner at this competition) took the bronze on the global stage.

Medal summary

Men

Women

Medal and points table
Key

Participation

References

Results
3rd European Winter Throwing Challenge Results. RFEA. Retrieved on 2013-11-16.
Euro Chall  Gioia Tauro  ITA  1 - 2 March. Tilastopaja. Retrieved on 2013-11-16.

European Throwing Cup
European Cup Winter Throwing
International athletics competitions hosted by Italy
2003 in European sport
European Cup Winter Throwing
Sport in Calabria